Mountain Lake Park is a town in Garrett County, Maryland, United States. As of the 2010 census, the town population was 2,092.

Donald W. Sincell is the current Mayor of Mountain Lake Park. Sincell was appointed to the position by the town council on July 13, 2017, to replace former mayor Leo Martin, who died June 25, 2017, but was re-elected posthumously on July 11, 2017.

Mountain Lake Park Historic District was listed on the National Register of Historic Places in 1983. Creedmore was listed in 1984.

Geography
Mountain Lake Park is located at  (39.400550, -79.381773).

Demographics

2010 census
As of the census of 2010, there were 2,092 people, 873 households, and 531 families living in the town. The racial makeup of the town was 97.8% White, 0.4% African American, 0.1% Native American, 0.3% Asian, and 1.3% from two or more races. Hispanic or Latino of any race were 0.6% of the population.

There were 873 households, of which 30.0% had children under the age of 18 living with them, 43.3% were married couples living together, 14.0% had a female householder with no husband present, 3.6% had a male householder with no wife present, and 39.2% were non-families. 32.4% of all households were made up of individuals, and 15.4% had someone living alone who was 65 years of age or older. The average household size was 2.27 and the average family size was 2.86.

The median age in the town was 44.4 years. 22.1% of residents were under the age of 18; 7.3% were between the ages of 18 and 24; 21.4% were from 25 to 44; 29.2% were from 45 to 64; and 20.1% were 65 years of age or older. The gender makeup of the town was 44.9% male and 55.1% female.

2000 census
As of the census of 2000, there were 2,248 people, 867 households, and 578 families living in the town. The racial makeup of the town was 99.20% White, 0.36% African American, 0.09% Native American, 0.04% Asian, 0.13% Pacific Islander, and 0.18% from two or more races. Hispanic or Latino of any race were 0.76% of the population.

There were 867 households, out of which 35.4% had children under the age of 18 living with them, 49.5% were married couples living together, 14.1% had a female householder with no husband present, and 33.3% were non-families. 30.0% of all households were made up of individuals, and 12.8% had someone living alone who was 65 years of age or older. The average household size was 2.45 and the average family size was 3.02.

In the town, the population was spread out, with 27.4% under the age of 18, 8.1% from 18 to 24, 25.1% from 25 to 44, 20.5% from 45 to 64, and 19.0% who were 65 years of age or older. The median age was 39 years. For every 100 females, there were 85.5 males. For every 100 females age 18 and over, there were 79.3 males.

The median income for a household in the town was $27,917, and the median income for a family was $37,105. Males had a median income of $29,219 versus $23,348 for females. The per capita income for the town was $14,589. About 16.2% of families and 17.9% of the population were below the poverty line, including 17.2% of those under age 18 and 15.2% of those age 65 or over.

Transportation

The main method of travel to and from Mountain Lake Park is by road. Several state-maintained highways serve the town, the most prominent of these being U.S. Route 219. US 219 brushes the western edge of Mountain Lake Park on Garrett Highway on its north–south journey across the region. To the south, US 219 connects to U.S. Route 50 before entering West Virginia. Heading north, US 219 passes through the towns of Oakland, Accident and Grantsville while having junctions with Maryland Route 39, Maryland Route 42, U.S. Route 40 and Interstate 68 before heading into Pennsylvania. Maryland Route 135 and Maryland Route 560 also serve Mountain Lake Park, with MD 135 providing connections eastward towards Deer Park and Luke, while MD 560 heads south through Loch Lynn Heights to Gorman.

References

External links

 Mountain Lake Park - historical photos, Whilbr

Towns in Maryland
Towns in Garrett County, Maryland